Zhang Jiansheng (born 30 December 1999) is a Chinese footballer currently playing as a forward for Dalian Pro.

Career statistics

Club
.

References

1999 births
Living people
Chinese footballers
Association football forwards
China League One players
Dalian Professional F.C. players
Meizhou Hakka F.C. players
Beijing Sport University F.C. players